Tyomkino is a rural locality (a selo) and the administrative center of Tyomkinsky District in Smolensk Oblast of Russia. Population:

History
Tyomkino was occupied by German forces during World War II and is still surrounded by a series of trenches and fortifications. The site of fierce fighting, munitions are still regularly unearthed in its fields.

Tourism and recreation
Tyomkino is a popular holiday destination, with its pure underground springs believed to have healing and recuperative powers.

Religion
Believed to be the final resting place of Saint Makaria, it has become a place of pilgrimage for followers of the Russian Orthodox faith. She was canonized for her powers of healing.

A new Russian Orthodox Church, constructed entirely of wood, has recently been built in Tyomkino.

References

Rural localities in Smolensk Oblast